Psammite (Greek: psammitēs "(made) from sand", from psammos "sand") is a general term for sandstone. It is equivalent to the Latin-derived term arenite and is commonly used in various publications to describe a metamorphosed sedimentary rock with a dominantly sandstone protolith. In Europe, this term was formerly used for a fine-grained, fissile, clayey sandstone. Pettijohn gives the following descriptive terms based on grain size, avoiding the use of terms such as "clay" or "argillaceous", which carry an implication of chemical composition:

References

Sandstone
Metasedimentary rocks
Sedimentary rocks
Sand